The AIM-152 AAAM was a long-range air-to-air missile developed by the United States. The AIM-152 was intended to serve as the successor to the AIM-54 Phoenix. The program went through a protracted development stage but was never adopted by the United States Navy, due to the ending of the Cold War and the reduction in threat of its perceived primary target, Soviet supersonic bombers. Development was cancelled in 1992.

Overview
The AIM-152 originated in a U.S. Navy requirement for an advanced air-to-air missile to replace the AIM-54 Phoenix. By the mid-1980s, the Phoenix was seen to be no longer cutting edge, and the Navy wanted a long-range missile to counter the Soviet Tu-22M Backfire and Tu-160 Blackjack long-range supersonic bombers. The goal was to produce a smaller and lighter weapon than the Phoenix, with equal or better range and a flight speed of Mach 3 or more.

Some of the systems considered for the missile had already been evaluated by the China Lake Naval Weapons Center in the early 1980s as part of the Advanced Common Intercept Missile Demonstration (ACIMD) program. ACIMD missiles had been built, but none had flown by the time the project was canceled. In 1987, Hughes/Raytheon and General Dynamics/Westinghouse were selected to produce competing designs for the AIM-152.

The Hughes/Raytheon design was largely based on the ACIMD missile, with a hybrid ramjet/solid rocket engine, which offered high speeds. The missile would use an inertial guidance system with terminal guidance provided by active radar homing—a mode of flight that would later be employed in the AIM-120 AMRAAM. An infrared terminal homing seeker was also planned, which would allow the missile to engage without actively emitting and alerting the target.

The GD/Westinghouse design was smaller, with a multiple-pulse pure solid rocket motor. It also had an inertial guidance system, but midcourse updating was provided via a dual-band semi-active radar. Terminal guidance was via an electro-optical sensor, with a backup infrared seeker also included. One flaw of semi-active radar homing is that the launch aircraft must illuminate the target with its radar during flight, meaning that it must fly towards the enemy and so expose itself to greater danger. GD/Westinghouse planned to avoid this by equipping the launching aircraft with a radar pod that could illuminate the target from both forward and aft, allowing it to turn and escape while still providing a target for the missile.

With the fall of the Soviet Union, the threat from Russian bombers effectively ended, and since no other nation could match the previous threat, the AAAM was left without an enemy to defend against. The project was canceled in 1992, shortly after the YAIM-152A designation had been given to the two prototypes.

With the phasing out of the Phoenix missile, the US Navy lost its long-range AAM capability, relying instead on the medium-range AIM-120 AMRAAM. Longer-range versions of the AMRAAM are being developed to restore some of this capability.

Specifications
(Note that the YAIM-152A missiles were never built, and as a result any specifications are speculative.)

Hughes/Raytheon :
 Length: 3.66 m (12 ft)
 Diameter: 231 mm (9 in)
 Weight: < 300 kg (660 lb)
 Speed: > Mach 3
 Range: > 185 km (115 miles) (100 nm)
 Propulsion: Rocket/ramjet engine
 Warhead: 14 to 23 kg (30 to 50 lb) blast-fragmentation

GD/Westinghouse :
 Length: 3.66 m (12 ft)
 Diameter: 140 mm (5.5 in)
 Weight: 172 kg (380 lb)
 Speed: > Mach 3
 Range: > 185 km (100 nm) (115 miles)
 Propulsion: Multiple-pulse solid-propellant rocket
 Warhead: 14 to 23 kg (30 to 50 lb) blast-fragmentation

See also 
FMRAAM
 Meteor (missile)
 R-37 (missile)
 K-100 (missile)
 PL-21

References

External links
 AIM-152 AAAM - Designation Systems

AIM-152
Abandoned military rocket and missile projects of the United States